Podgorny is a rural locality (a village) in Makarovsky Selsoviet, Ishimbaysky District, Bashkortostan, Russia. The population was 26 as of 2010. There are 2 streets.

Geography 
Podgorny is located 52 km northeast of Ishimbay (the district's administrative centre) by road. Ziganovka is the nearest rural locality.

References 

Rural localities in Ishimbaysky District